Yar-Bishkadak (Yar-Bişqaźaq) is a rural locality (a village) in Urman-Bishkadaksky Selsoviet, Ishimbaysky District, Bashkortostan, Russia. The population was 539 as of 2010. There are 5 streets in this locality.

Geography 
Yar-Bishkadak is located 6 km north of Ishimbay (the district's administrative centre) by road. Ishimbay is the nearest rural locality.

References 

Rural localities in Ishimbaysky District